Willie Irvine (born 28 December 1963 in Stirling) is a Scottish football manager who was formerly a player. Irvine played for Stirling Albion, Hibernian, Dunfermline, FK Vidar, Vålerenga, Airdrie, Albion Rovers, Meadowbank Thistle, Berwick Rangers, Alloa and Stenhousemuir. Irvine played in 571 Scottish Football League matches, scoring 201 goals.

After retiring as a player, Irvine became manager of Junior club Sauchie. He then managed Bo'ness United and Norwegian club Lillesand before becoming manager of Pollok in March 2010. Irvine resigned from his position with Pollok on 10 October 2011.

Honours

Player
Alloa Athletic
Scottish Challenge Cup 1999–2000

See also
List of footballers in Scotland by number of league appearances (500+)
List of footballers in Scotland by number of league goals (200+)

References

External links

Willie Irvine, www.ihibs.co.uk

1963 births
Living people
Footballers from Stirling
Association football forwards
Scottish footballers
Stirling Albion F.C. players
Hibernian F.C. players
Dunfermline Athletic F.C. players
FK Vidar players
Vålerenga Fotball players
Airdrieonians F.C. (1878) players
Albion Rovers F.C. players
Livingston F.C. players
Berwick Rangers F.C. players
Alloa Athletic F.C. players
Stenhousemuir F.C. players
Scottish expatriate footballers
Expatriate footballers in Norway
Scottish expatriate sportspeople in Norway
Scottish football managers
Scottish Football League players
Sauchie F.C. managers
Bo'ness United F.C. managers
Pollok F.C. managers